After the Spring: A Story of Tunisian Youth is a graphic novel by  about the aftermath of the Tunisian Revolution as experienced by four young people. The English version, released in 2019, was translated by Edward Gauvin and published by IDW Comics/Penguin Random House.

The events of the graphic novel occurred in 2013.

References

Further reading
 
 Media
  - Available on YouTube

External links
 After the Spring - IDW Publishing
 After the Spring - Penguin Random House
 ''Apres le printemps  -  

Tunisian Revolution
French comics
2018 in comics
Comics set in the 2010s
Works about the Arab Spring